Reimund Dietzen sometimes written Raimund Dietzen (born 29 May 1959 in Trier, Rhineland-Palatinate) is a retired road and cyclo-cross cyclist from Germany, who was a professional rider from 1982 to 1990.

Cycling career
Dietzen was a successful amateur winning the German cyclo-cross championship in 1980 and 1981 as well as winning in road races. He turned professional with the Swiss team Puch in 1982. He won the cyclo-cross race the Grand Prix Jean Bausch-Pierre Kellner that year. The following year he joined a Spanish cycling team Teka with whom he would stay with for the rest of his career. In his first year with his new team he won the Volta a la Comunitat Valenciana. The following year he became the champion of Germany in the road race and cyclo-cross as well his first stage victory in the Vuelta a España. He won the stage to the Lagos de Covadonga which is a very steep climb and a prestigious stage to win. He would finish that year's edition of the Vuelta third overall. The following year he was again cyclo-cross champion as well as the winner of the Vuelta a Cantabria. In 1986 he was again German road champion and won a second stage in the 1986 Vuelta a España. In 1987 he wore the leader's jersey in the 1987 Vuelta a España for five days before losing it to Herrera and then finishing the race second overall to Luis Herrera of Colombia. Dietzen finished the 1988 Vuelta a España second overall, this time to Sean Kelly of Ireland. In the 1989 Vuelta a España, Dietzen won a stage but several days later he crashed. He had ridden into a tunnel which was not illuminated and crashed, suffering career-ending injuries. He was only 30 years of age when the following year he stopped as a professional after not recovering. Seventeen years later, the Supreme Court of Spain ordered the organisers of the Vuelta a España to pay damages to Dietzen. Dietzen obtained nearly all of his success in Spanish races with wins in Vuelta a La Rioja, Vuelta a Castilla y León, the Setmana Catalana de Ciclisme and he finished in the top 10 of every Vuelta a España between 1984-1988, three of which were on the podium.

Post-cycling career
From 2003, Dietzen was a directeur sportif with the now-defunct Team Gerolsteiner. He lives in Spain.

Career achievements

Major results

Cyclo-cross
1981–1982
 1st Grand Prix Jean Bausch-Pierre Kellner
 2nd National Championships
1983–1984
 1st  National Championships
1984–1985
 1st  National Championships
Road
1981
 Grand Prix Guillaume Tell
1st Stages 3 & 4 
 3rd Paris–Roubaix Espoirs
1982
 1st Trofeo Luis Puig
 7th Overall Tour de Luxembourg
1983
 1st  Overall Volta a la Comunitat Valenciana
1st Stage 4 
 2nd Road race, National Road Championships
 3rd Overall Setmana Catalana de Ciclisme
1st Prologue 
 3rd Clásica de San Sebastián
1984
 1st  Road race, National Road Championships
 1st Stage 1 Vuelta Asturias
 2nd Overall Setmana Catalana de Ciclisme
 2nd Clásica de San Sebastián
 3rd Overall Vuelta a España
1st Stage 12 
 3rd Clásica a los Puertos de Guadarrama
1985
 1st  Overall Vuelta a Cantabria
1st Stage 2
 2nd Overall Vuelta a Burgos
 2nd Overall Vuelta Asturias
 3rd Overall Tour of Galicia
 7th Overall Vuelta a España
1986
 1st  Road race, National Road Championships
 1st  Overall Vuelta a Cantabria
1st Stage 3
 1st Stage 4a Vuelta a Murcia
 1st Stage 5 Vuelta a Aragón
 4th Overall Vuelta a España
1st Stage 12 
 7th Overall Tour of the Basque Country
 7th Overall Setmana Catalana de Ciclisme
1987
 1st  Overall Vuelta a La Rioja
1st Prologue 
 2nd Overall Vuelta a España
 2nd Subida al Naranco
 3rd Overall Vuelta a Aragón
1988
 1st  Overall Vuelta a Castilla y León
1st Stage 3
 2nd Overall Vuelta a España
 3rd Subida al Naranco
1989
 1st  Overall Setmana Catalana de Ciclisme
 1st Stage 9 Vuelta a España

Grand Tour general classification results timeline

References

External links
Official site
Profile on Team Gerolsteiner website

1959 births
Living people
Sportspeople from Trier
German male cyclists
Cyclo-cross cyclists
Cyclists from Rhineland-Palatinate
German cycling road race champions